Antonio Stradivari (1644–1737) was an Italian luthier and craftsman of string instruments

Stradivari may also refer to:

 Omobono Stradivari (1679–1742), violin maker, son of Antonio
 Stradivari (1935 film), a German drama 
 Stradivari (1988 film), a French-Italian biographical drama 
 19189 Stradivari, minor planet

See also

 Stradivarius (disambiguation)
 Stradivarius, a string instrument built by members of the Italian family Stradivari
 List of Stradivarius instruments
 Stradivari Society, a philanthropic organization based in Chicago, Illinois